George Wilde (9 January 1610 – 29 December 1665) was Bishop of Derry from 1661 to 1665.

Wilde was born in London, the son of Henry Wilde. He was educated at Merchant Taylors’ School (admitted 1619) and St John's College, Oxford (matriculated 1629 aged 19, fellow 1631–48, B.C.L. 1635 (incorporated at Cambridge 1635), D.C.L. 1647).

Ordained in 1636, he was Chaplain to William Laud, Archbishop of Canterbury; then Vicar of St Giles, Reading; and Rector of Biddenden. A committed Royalist, after the Restoration, Wilde was appointed to the episcopate and consecrated at St Patrick's Cathedral, Dublin  on 27 January 1661. His funeral sermon was preached by Robert Mossom, his successor.

References

1610 births
Anglican clergy from London
People educated at Merchant Taylors' School, Northwood
Alumni of St John's College, Oxford
Anglican bishops of Derry
People from Reading, Berkshire
People from Biddenden
1665 deaths